Sts. Peter and Paul Church is a Roman Catholic church, designated for Polish immigrants in Three Rivers, Massachusetts, United States.  Founded in 1903, it is one of the Polish-American Roman Catholic parishes in New England in the Diocese of Springfield in Massachusetts.

In 2010, the neighboring St. Anne Parish closed and merged with Sts. Peter and Paul Parish to form Divine Mercy Parish at Sts. Peter and Paul Church.

History 
According to the record, the first Polish immigrant arrived in the town of Palmer in the year 1886. Through the efforts of Fr. Franciszek Chalupka,  the small group of Polish settlers in Three Rivers, Thorndike and Bondsville were organized as the St. Joseph Men's Society of Thorndike in April 1895.

In 1899, the St. Joseph's Society chose representatives and the committee visited Bishop Daniel T. Beaven. With the assistance of a lawyer, David Dillon, they finally were granted permission to organize and to establish the Sts. Peter and Paul Parish at Four Corners in Three Rivers.

In July 1902, Beaven appointed Wacław Lenz as the first pastor for Polish descent residing in the towns at Four Corners. At the first meeting they decided to build the church in the center of the town of Palmer and chose the present site in the village of Three Rivers opposite the Town Hall.

Pastors 
 Venceslaus (Wacław) Lenz (1902–1911)
 Władysław Kielbasinski (1911–1913)
 Andrew (Andrzej) Krzywda (1913–1947)
 Joseph (Józef) Szczepaniak (1947–1948)
 Alphonse A. Skoniecki (1948–1972)
 Robert J. Ceckowski (1972–1997)
 Stefan J. Niemczyk (1997–)

References

Bibliography 
 
 
 The Official Catholic Directory in USA

External links 
 SS Peter & Paul - Diocesan Information
 SS Peter & Paul - ParishesOnline.com
 Diocese of Springfield in Massachusetts
http://www.churchofdivinemercy.org/

Roman Catholic parishes of Diocese of Springfield in Massachusetts
Polish-American Roman Catholic parishes in Massachusetts
Roman Catholic churches completed in 1905
1905 establishments in Massachusetts
20th-century Roman Catholic church buildings in the United States